Tadeusz is a Polish first name, derived from Thaddaeus.

Tadeusz may refer to:

 Tadeusz Bór-Komorowski (1895–1966), Polish military leader
 Tadeusz Borowski (1922–1951), Polish writer and The Holocaust survivor
 Tadeusz Boy-Żeleński (1874–1941), Polish gynaecologist, writer, poet, art critic, translator of French literary classics and journalist
 Tadeusz Brzeziński (1896–1991), Polish consular official and the father of President Jimmy Carter's national security adviser, Zbigniew Brzezinski
 Tadeusz Czeżowski (1889–1981), Polish philosopher and logician
 Tadeusz Dołęga-Mostowicz (1898–1939), Polish journalist and author of over a dozen popular novels
 Tadeusz Drzazga (born 1975), Polish weightlifter
 Tadeusz Hollender (1910–1943), Polish poet, translator and humorist
 Tadeusz Jordan-Rozwadowski (1866 – 1928) was a Polish military commander, diplomat, and politician, a founder of the modern Polish Republic 
 Tadeusz Kantor (1915–1990), Polish artist and theatre-maker
 Tadeusz Kassern (1904–1957), Polish composer
 Tadeusz Wladyslaw Konopka, birth name of Ted Knight (1923–1986), American actor
 Tadeusz Konwicki (1926–2015), Polish writer
 Tadeusz Kościuszko (1746–1817), Polish–Lithuanian military leader and national hero, and American Revolutionary War general
 Tadeusz Kotarbiński (1886–1981), pupil of Kazimierz Twardowski
 Tadeusz Krwawicz (1910–1988), Polish pioneer in medicine
 Tadeusz Kurcyusz (1881–1944), commandant of Narodowe Sily Zbrojne
 Tadeusz Łomnicki (1927–1992), Polish actor
 Tadeusz Michalik (born 1991), Polish Olympic bronze medalist in Greco-Roman wrestling at the 2020 Olympics
 Tadeusz Miciński (1873–1918), Polish poet and playwright
 Tadeusz Pietrzykowski (1917–1991), Polish boxer and Polish Armed Forces soldier, known as the "boxing champion of Auschwitz"
 Tadeusz Piotrowski (mountaineer) (1940–1986), mountaineer and writer
 Tadeusz Piotrowski (sociologist) (born 1940), sociologist and author of books about Holocaust and the history of Poland
 Tadeusz Rejtan (1742–1780), Polish nobleman
 Tadeusz Romer (1894–1978), Polish diplomat and politician
 Tadeusz Różewicz (1921–2014), Polish poet and writer
 Tadeusz Rut (1931–2002), Polish hammer thrower
 Tadeusz Sapierzyński (born 1958), Polish army officer
 Tadeusz Swietochowski (1934–2017), American historian and Caucasologist
 Tadeusz Ślusarski (1950–1998), Polish Olympic gold medalist in pole vault at the 1976 Olympics
 Tadeusz Tański (1892–1941), Polish automobile engineer and the designer of, among others, the first Polish serially-built automobile
 Tadeusz Tomaszewski (born 1959), Polish politician, Member of the Parliament
 Tadeusz Ważewski (1896–1972), Polish mathematician
 Tadeusz Żychiewicz (1922–1994), Polish journalist, art historian and publicist

In fiction, Tadeusz can refer to:
 Tadeusz Soplica, the titular character of Pan Tadeusz, an 1834 epic poem by Adam Mickiewicz

Polish masculine given names